Bill LaVoy is a Democratic former member of the Michigan House of Representatives. Prior to serving in the House, LaVoy worked as the executive director of Monroe Public Access Cable Television.

He was first elected in 2012, was successfully reelected in 2014, before losing his bid for a third term in 2016.

In 2018 he challenged incumbent 
State Senator Dale Zorn in the 17th district, losing by 58% to 39%. At the same time his wife Michelle LaVoy faced Joe Bellino for his old house seat but she was also unsuccessful.

In 2013, LaVoy proposed a successful resolution that declared October 4 French-Canadian Heritage Day.

References

External links
 
Legislative website
Twitter account

Living people
Democratic Party members of the Michigan House of Representatives
1967 births
University of Michigan alumni
21st-century American politicians